Leon Smith may refer to:

 Leon Smith (basketball) (born 1980), American former basketball player
 Leon Smith (naval commander) (died 1869), Texas Marine Department during American Civil War
 Leon Smith (politician) (born 1937), Idaho House of Representatives
 Leon Smith (tennis) (born 1976), Scottish tennis coach
 Leon Kristopher Smith (1978–2011), New Zealand soldier
 Leon Polk Smith (1906–1996), American painter

See also
 Lee Smith (disambiguation)
 Liam Smith (disambiguation)